Archbishop of Santiago may refer to:

Archbishop of Santiago (Chile)
Archbishop of Santiago de Cuba
Archbishop of Santiago de los Caballeros, Dominican Republic
Archbishop of the Roman Catholic Archdiocese of Santiago de Guatemala
Archbishop of Santiago de Compostela, in Galicia, Spain